The Women's pentathlon 5 was a pentathlon event held in athletics at the 1972 Summer Paralympics in Heidelberg.

O'Brien (full name not recorded) of Great Britain was the only competitor, despite the other pentathlon events having several competitors. She completed the event, alone, scoring 1499 points, to take the gold medal.

References 

Pentathlon